The UEFA Women's Under-19 Championship 2009 Final Tournament was held in Belarus from 13 to 25 July 2009. Players born on or after 1 January 1990 were eligible to participate in this competition. The tournament served as a qualifier for the 2010 FIFA U-20 Women's World Cup in Germany.

Qualification
There were two qualification rounds.

First qualifying round

Group 1
 Host country: Portugal.

Group 2
 Host country: Poland.

Group 3
 Host country: Sweden.

Group 4
 Host country: Lithuania.

Group 5
 Host country: Slovenia.

Group 6
 Host country: Azerbaijan.

Group 7
 Host country: Israel.

Group 8
 Host country: Bosnia-Herzegovina.

Group 9
 Host country: Macedonia.

Group 10
 Host country: Serbia.

Group 11
 Host country: Bulgaria.

Ranking of third-placed teams
Matches against the fourth-placed team in each of the groups are not included in this ranking.

Second qualifying round

Group 1
 Host country: Poland.

Group 2
 Host country: Austria.

Group 3
 Host country: Portugal.

Group 4
 Host country: Germany.

Group 5
 Host country: Switzerland.

Group 6
 Host country: Hungary.

Ranking of second-placed teams
Matches against the fourth-placed team in each of the groups are not included in this ranking.

Final tournament

Group stage

Group A

Group B

Knockout stage

Semifinals

Final

MATCH OFFICIALS
Assistant referees:
Maja Dovnik (Slovenia)
Paula Brady (Ireland)
Fourth official: Carina Vitulano (Italy)

Awards

Goalscorers

5 goals
 Sofia Jakobsson

4 goals
 Toni Duggan
 Solène Barbance

3 goals
 Jordan Nobbs
 Dzsenifer Marozsán

2 goals

  Isobel Christiansen
  Jade Moore
  Jessica Wich
  Ana-Maria Crnogorčević

1 goal

  Ekaterina Miklashevich
  Chelsea Weston
  Pauline Crammer
  Léa Rubio
  Charlène Sasso
  Fanny Tenret
  Marie-Louise Bagehorn
  Svenja Huth
  Stefanie Mirlach
  Alexandra Popp
  Selina Wagner
  Lena Wermelt
  Arna Sif Asgrimsdottir
  Cecilie Pedersen
  Jennifer Egelryd
  Antonia Göransson
  Jenny Hjohlman
  Emelie Lövgren
  Ramona Bachmann
  Bettina Baer
  Jehona Mehmeti

References

External links
Official website
Women's Under-19 Championship attendances

 

2009–10 in European football
2009 in Belarusian football
2009
2009
UEFA
2009–10 in English women's football
2009 in Swedish women's football
July 2009 sports events in Europe
2009 in youth association football